Archibald  Macarthur (died 1847) was a Scottish Presbyterian minister who became the first Presbyterian minister in Australia when he arrived in Hobart in 1822.

References
S. M. Mortyn, 'Macarthur, Archibald ( - 1847)', Australian Dictionary of Biography, Volume 2, Melbourne University Press: Melbourne, 1967, p. 144.

1847 deaths
People from Hobart
Scottish emigrants to colonial Australia
Settlers of Tasmania
Australian Presbyterian ministers
Year of birth unknown